Römhild is a town in the district of Hildburghausen, in Thuringia, Germany. It is situated 14 km west of Hildburghausen, and 21 km southeast of Meiningen. On 31 December 2012, it merged with the former municipalities Gleichamberg, Haina, Mendhausen, Milz and Westenfeld.

In the Stadtkirche of Römhild is the tomb of Elisabeth (a daughter of Albrecht III Achilles, Elector of Brandenburg) and Hermann VIII of Henneberg. The grave has sometimes been attributed to Herman Vischer the Younger (c.1486–1517), a member of the Vischer Family of Nuremberg.

Sons and daughters of the town

 Hans Hut (1490–1527), Anabaptist
 Lucas Maius (1522–1598), Protestant theologian and dramatist
 Max Saalmüller (1832–1890), Prussian Lieutenant-Colonel and Lepidopterologist
 Alfred Götze (1865–1948), Prehistorian, honorary citizen 1929

References

External links
 Albrecht Dürer drawing for Römhild
 Parish church of Römhild
 Private Site about Römhild

Hildburghausen (district)
Duchy of Saxe-Meiningen